The 1901 Columbia Blue and White football team was an American football team that represented Columbia University as an independent during the 1901 college football season. Chauncey L. Berrien was the team captain.

Two Columbia backs were selected as first-team players on the 1901 All-America team: Harold Weekes (from Walter Camp) and Bill Morley (from Caspar Whitney). Berrien and Richard Shore Smith also played in the backfield.

Before the season 
In its October 1901 preview of the college football season, Harper's Weekly opined: "In Weekes, Morley, and Berrien, Columbia has a trio that is equalled by no other college this year." 

Columbia's sports teams were commonly called the "Blue and White" in this era, but had no official nickname. The name "Lions" would not be adopted until 1910.

The team played its home games at the Polo Grounds in Upper Manhattan.

Schedule

Season summary

Preseason
Morley resigned as captain and Chauncey L. Berrien took his place.

Week 1: at Buffalo
On the eve of the first game with Buffalo, the faculty announced a number of leading players were forbidden to play.

Week 4: at Harvard
In "the first big football battle of the season," Columbia lost to Harvard 18 to 0. Captain Berrien had been prevented from playing by Columbia faculty.

Week 6: at Yale
Columbia gave Yale one of its hardest games of the season in a 10 to 5 loss, holding the Bulldogs scoreless in the first half.

Week 8: Penn
Columbia defeated Penn 10 to 0, its first victory over Penn since the school instituted a coaching system, and its second ever.

Week 13: Carlisle

Columbia rolled up its largest score of the season, defeating the Carlisle Indians 40 to 12. It was 40 to 0 until the final five minutes. Starring in the contest was Columbia's backfield of Bill Morley, Harold Weekes, Richard Shore Smith, and Chauncey L. Berrien.

Postseason
In his review of the 1901 football season, Charles Edward Patterson wrote: "Morley, stocky, muscular, not to be denied his two yards help or no help (and three times two means six, or a first down, you know!) able to repeat indefinitely, the best interferer in present day football, a forty yard punter and a drop-kicker who can actually score."

Morley took over as the team's head coach the following year.

Players

Line
Edward Bright Bruce, tackle

Backfield

Subs
H. Van. Hoevenberg, quarterback

References

Columbia
Columbia Lions football seasons
Columbia Blue and White football